Petra Granlund (born 15 October 1987) is a swimmer from Valla, representing Väsby SS. Granlund participated in the 2008 Summer Olympics for Sweden in the 200 m butterfly and in the 4 × 200 m freestyle relay. She finished 14th in the 200 m butterfly and 8th in the 4×200 freestyle relay, alongside Josefin Lillhage, Gabriella Fagundez and Ida Marko-Varga.

Clubs 
 S77 Stenungsund
 Väsby SS

References 

1987 births
Swedish female butterfly swimmers
Swedish female freestyle swimmers
Swimmers at the 2008 Summer Olympics
Olympic swimmers of Sweden
Medalists at the FINA World Swimming Championships (25 m)
People from Katrineholm Municipality
Living people
S77 Stenungsund swimmers
Väsby SS swimmers
Sportspeople from Södermanland County